Ann Tenno (née Ann Epler; born 4 December 1952 in Tartu) is an Estonian photographer and photo artist.
Lonely Planet states that "some of the most spectacular and sensitive photographs of Estonia have been taken by Ann Tenno and published in books which best capture the spirit of Estonian nature." She is noted in particular for her town landscapes, especially photographs of the Estonian capital of Tallinn,  and the churches and manor houses of Estonia.

Early life
In 1971 she graduated from Tartu Secondary School No. 5. In 1976 she graduated with a degree in algebra from the Faculty of Mathematics at the University of Tartu. She then worked in the field of mathematics in the Economic Department of the University of Tartu and Department of Mathematics of the Tallinn University of Technology until 1984, when she began working at the Design Institute of Cultural Monuments as a photographer.

Career

Tenno has worked as a freelance photographer, and her images have been compiled and published in numerous books of other authors. Her photo exhibitions were mainly in the 1980s, and she has since published numerous photographic books which have been warmly received by critics. In 1998 she published a book of photographs of the Estonian capital of Tallinn, and in 2002 she published a book of photographs on the churches of Estonia.   The Baltic Times praised the photographs, saying that they "fill the airy room with exotic sights". She is also the co-author with Juhan Maiste of Manor Houses of Estonia. This book received considerable acclaim and was cited by City paper: the Baltic States as "the most beautiful book on Estonian manors". The Baltic Review cited her as a "well known" photographer of Estonia whose works provide "a genuine depiction of life in contemporary Estonia."

Selected books
Tallinn (1992)
Leben Danach (1994)
 (1996)
 (1997)
Highway USA (1998)
Tallinna album (1998)
 (1999)
Inglismaa aiad (2000)
Pärnu (2001)
 with Jüri Kuuskemaa (2002)
Jaapan. Aiad (2002)
Eestimaa (2005)
Tallinn (2005)
 (2010)
Eesti. Estonian Landscapes (2016)

References

External links
https://anntenno.ee
Photographers of the World page

Estonian photographers
Estonian women photographers
1952 births
Living people
People from Tartu
University of Tartu alumni
Academic staff of the University of Tartu
Academic staff of the Tallinn University of Technology
Recipients of the Order of the White Star, 3rd Class
21st-century Estonian women artists
20th-century Estonian women artists